Kaiser is the German word for "emperor". Franz is a German name and cognate of "Francis".

Kaiser Franz may refer to:

Monarchs 
 Franz I (1708–1765), Holy Roman Emperor
 Franz II (1768–1835), Holy Roman Emperor, founder of the Austrian Empire
 Franz Joseph I (1830–1916), Austrian Emperor

Others 
 Franz Beckenbauer (* 1945), former German football player and manager
 Franz Klammer (* 1953), former Austrian ski racer